Baldoyle railway station served nearby Baldoyle. It was located, on the down side, between Howth Junction and Portmarnock, the later Clongriffin is now past the site of this former station towards Portmarnock.

History
Opened in 1844, it was one of the stations of the original Dublin-Drogheda line. The station closed to regular traffic in 1848 with the opening of Howth Junction. However, it remained in use for Baldoyle race specials until 1852.

References 

Disused railway stations in County Dublin
Railway stations in Ireland closed in 1848
Railway stations in the Republic of Ireland opened in 1844